Olive Nuhfer (1901-1996) was an American painter. She is best known for her New Deal era mural in the Westerville, Ohio Post Office.

Biography
Nuhfer née  Austin was born on August 16, 1901, in Pittsburgh, Pennsylvania. In 1926 she married Leo R. Nuhfer.  She attended the University of Oklahoma and the Carnegie Institute of Technology. In 1937 she painted the mural The Daily Mail for the Westerville, Ohio Post Office. The mural was funded by the Treasury Section of Fine Arts (TSFA). Around 1959 she painted a portrait of Dwight D. Eisenhower, which is now in the collection of the Dwight D. Eisenhower Library-Museum. Her 1937 portrait Electric Welder is in the Steidle Collection of American Industrial Art at Penn State College of Earth and Mineral Sciences.

In 1961, Nuhfer founded the Penn Arts Association in Penn Hills, Pennsylvania.

She died on October 8, 1996, in Pittsburgh.

In 2016, her painting Pittsburgh Landscape was included in the exhibition The Gift of Art: 100 Years of Art from the Pittsburgh Public Schools' Collection at the Heinz History Center.

References

1901 births
1996 deaths
20th-century American painters
20th-century American women artists
American muralists
American women painters
People from Pittsburgh
Women muralists